The Shaftesbury Avenue Handicap, is a Victoria Racing Club Group 3 Thoroughbred open handicap horse race, over a distance of 1400 metres held annually at Flemington Racecourse in Melbourne during the VRC Autumn Racing Carnival in March.  Total prize money for the race is A$160,000.

History
The registered race is named after Shaftesbury Avenue, who won the 1991 VRC Newmarket Handicap and 1991 Lightning Stakes.

Name
2001–2004 - PFD Food Services Stakes
2005–2007 - Chubb Stakes  
2008–2009  -   Melbourne Food & Wine Plate
2010  -   Mrs Mac's Pies Handicap     
2011  -   TAB 50th Birthday Stakes
2012  -   VIC TAB Guaranteed $2m Quaddie Stakes    
2013  -   TAB Stakes
2014–2017 - TAB Rewards Stakes 
2018 - TAB Multiplier Autumn Handicap
2019 onwards - The TAB Shaftesbury Avenue Handicap

Grade
2001–2007 - Listed Race
2008–2010 - Open Handicap (unlisted)
 2011–2013 - Listed Race
 2014 onwards  - Group 3

Venue
 The race was run at Caulfield Racecourse in 2007 due to reconstruction of the Flemington racetrack.

Winners

 2023 - Scallopini
 2022 - Kissonallforcheeks 
 2021 - Morvada 
 2020 - Blazejowski 
 2019 - Violate
 2018 - Nozomi
 2017 - He Or She
 2016 - Red Bomber
 2015 - Amorino
 2014 - Mouro
 2013 - Launay
 2012 - Rockpecker
 2011 - Launay
 2010 - Stillme
 2009 - Rockpecker
 2008 - Orange County
 2007 - Recapitalize
 2006 - Sojustrememberthis
 2005 - Youth
 2004 - Cross Current
 2003 - Belle Ball
 2002 - Tears Royal
 2001 - Sedation

See also
 List of Australian Group races
 Group races

References

Horse races in Australia
Flemington Racecourse
2001 establishments in Australia
Recurring sporting events established in 2001